Rafely Rosario (born 8 September 1986) is a Dominican singer. In 2010, Rosario was nominated for a Lo Nuestro Award for Tropical New Artist of the Year.

References

Living people
21st-century Dominican Republic male singers
1986 births
Merengue musicians